Artur Suzik (born on 29 November 1967) is an Estonian military personnel (Colonel).

Since 2013 he is the head of NATO Cooperative Cyber Defence Centre of Excellence's Estonian contingency.

In 2006 he was awarded with Order of the Cross of the Eagle, IV class.

References

Living people
1967 births
Estonian military personnel